Paraptila cornucopis is a species of moth of the family Tortricidae. It is found in Mexico in the Federal District and the states of San Luis Potosí, Colima and Veracruz.

The length of the forewings is 6.9 mm for males and 6.8-9.5 mm for females. The ground colour of the forewings is dark red brown in the basal area, followed by a tawny-grey band, with faint purplish suffusion and irregular dark striae. There is also a silver-white patch bordering and a red-brown band. A red-brown area is situated apically and immediately posterior to the costal patch. The hindwings are dingy white with uniform light grey-brown overscaling.

References

Moths described in 1914
Euliini